Soleyman Qeshlaq (also Romanized as Soleymān Qeshlāq; also known as Sulaimān Qishlāq and Suleyman-Kishlak) is a village in Kaghazkonan-e Markazi Rural District, Kaghazkonan District, Meyaneh County, East Azerbaijan Province, Iran. At the 2006 census, its population was 30, in 6 families.

References 

Populated places in Meyaneh County